Idelino Gomes Colubali (born 1 January 1995), known as Idé Gomes or Idé Colubali, is a Bissau-Guinean professional footballer who plays as a forward for Eccellenza Sicily club Mazara.

Career
On 5 December 2015, Colubali made his professional debut with Boavista in a 2014–15 Primeira Liga match against Paços Ferreira.

In August 2019, he joined Gibraltar National League side Lincoln Red Imps. Colubali then moved to Albanian club Teuta Durrës in January 2020.

He then briefly played in Iceland for 2. deild karla (third tier) club Magni Grenivík. After returning to Gondomar, he moved to Italy to sign for Eccellenza Sicily amateurs Mazara in September 2022.

References

External links

Stats and profile at LPFP 

1994 births
Living people
Bissau-Guinean footballers
Association football forwards
Primeira Liga players
Norwegian First Division players
Kategoria Superiore players
Gibraltar National League players
Gondomar S.C. players
C.D. Fátima players
U.D. Leiria players
S.C.U. Torreense players
A.C. Alcanenense players
Boavista F.C. players
FK Jerv players
C.D. Cinfães players
Sertanense F.C. players
Lincoln Red Imps F.C. players
KF Teuta Durrës players
Bissau-Guinean expatriate footballers
Bissau-Guinean expatriate sportspeople in Portugal
Expatriate footballers in Portugal
Bissau-Guinean expatriate sportspeople in Norway
Expatriate footballers in Norway
Bissau-Guinean expatriate sportspeople in Gibraltar
Expatriate footballers in Gibraltar
Bissau-Guinean expatriate sportspeople in Albania
Expatriate footballers in Albania